"The National Anthem" is a song by the English rock band Radiohead, released on their fourth album, Kid A (2000). The song is moored to a repetitive bassline, and develops in a direction influenced by jazz.

Background and recording

Radiohead's singer, Thom Yorke, wrote the "National Anthem" bassline when he was 16. In 1997, Radiohead recorded drums and bass for the song, intending to develop it as a B-side for their third album, OK Computer (1997). Instead, they saved it for their next album, Kid A (2000). Yorke played bass on the studio recording.

Jonny Greenwood added Ondes Martenot and sampled sounds from radio stations, and Yorke's vocals were processed with a ring modulator. In November 1999, Radiohead recorded a brass section inspired by the "organised chaos" of Town Hall Concert by the jazz musician Charles Mingus. Yorke and Greenwood directed the musicians to sound like a "traffic jam"; according to Yorke, he jumped up and down so much during his conducting that he broke his foot. Yorke said: "The running joke when we were in the studios was, 'Just blow. Just blow, just blow, just blow.'"

An early demo of "The National Anthem" was included in the special edition of the 2017 OK Computer reissue OKNOTOK 1997 2017.

Composition

The free jazz section was described as "a brass band marching into a brick wall" by one reviewer. Simon Reynolds of Spin said: "the song is a strange, thrilling blast of kosmik highway music — combining Hawkwind's "Silver Machine" with Can's "Mother Sky" and throwing in free-jazz bedlam for good measure". Cam Lindsey of Exclaim! wrote that the song is a "radical jazz-rock fusion". David Fricke of Rolling Stone called the song "crusty funk".

Critical reception
The song received polarised reviews from music critics. In his review of the album for the New Yorker, Nick Hornby mentioned the song as "an unpleasant free-jazz workout, with a discordant horn section squalling over a studiedly crude bass line". Mark Beaumont, who disparaged Kid A in Melody Maker on its release, wrote ten years later that the "free-form jazz horns" of "The National Anthem" produced a "mingus-in-a-tumble-dryer racket". Lorraine Ali, writing for Newsweek, described the song as "annoying pileup of squawking instruments". Rob Sheffield of Rolling Stone said the horn section "was a cornier-than-usual art-rock cliché, trying way too hard for a way-too-obvious gimmick".

However, Adam Downer of Sputnikmusic said that "by the end of the song, you're in awe of such a jam session" and named it a "recommended track". In a review for a live performance of Radiohead, Siobhan Kane of The Irish Times praised the song: "it distills Radiohead's worldview, with those guitars and Yorke's evocative voice, all intelligence and deep emotion." Cam Lindsey of Exclaim! cited it as the album's standout track.

Reviewing the demo version released on OKNOTOK 1997 2017, Record Collector wrote that the song "could very easily have resembled the sort of latterday U2 track chosen to soundtrack Goal of the Month reels ... That Radiohead had the self-awareness to sit on it rather than go for the drive-time jugular says so much about their intuitive good taste, and the prolonged success it would bring them."

Live performances
Radiohead has performed "The National Anthem" with a wind section in their 2000 performances in New York City (one of which was at Radiohead's taping for Saturday Night Live), a 2001 performance in London for the BBC's Later with Jools Holland, during a 2001 concert in Paris, and on The Colbert Report in 2011.

Cover versions
"The National Anthem" has been covered by numerous artists, including: Japanese shamisen duo Yoshida Brothers, on their album Prism; Meshell Ndegeocello, for the tribute album Exit Music: Songs with Radio Heads; Mr Russia, for the tribute album Every Machine Makes a Mistake: A Tribute to Radiohead; and Vernon Reid, for the album Other True Self. Ayurveda (band) and Umphrey's McGee covered the song on live performances.

The Jazz Passengers did an instrumental version on their album Reunited. A "marvellously squalling version" by the University of Arizona marching band was praised in the Guardian. Lupe Fiasco used a sample of the song on the mixtape Enemy of the State: A Love Story in the song "The National Anthem".

Personnel

Radiohead
 Colin Greenwood
 Jonny Greenwood
 Ed O'Brien
 Philip Selway
 Thom Yorke

Additional personnel 
 Nigel Godrich production, engineering, mixing
 Gerard Navarro production assistance, additional engineering
 Graeme Stewart additional engineering

Additional musicians 
Henry Binns – rhythm sampling
Andy Bush – trumpet
Andy Hamilton – tenor saxophone
Steve Hamilton – alto saxophone
Stan Harrison – baritone saxophone
Martin Hathaway – alto saxophone
Liam Kirkman – trombone
Mike Kearsey – bass trombone
Mark Lockheart – tenor saxophone

References

Radiohead songs
2000 songs
Jazz fusion songs
Song recordings produced by Nigel Godrich
Songs written by Thom Yorke
Songs written by Colin Greenwood
Songs written by Jonny Greenwood
Songs written by Philip Selway
Songs written by Ed O'Brien
Free jazz songs
Funk songs